ISS International School (usually referred to as ISS and formerly known as the International School of Singapore) is a co-educational international school in Singapore. It is an International Baccalaureate (IB) World School founded in 1981 and offers IB curriculum from Kindergarten to Grade 12. and is located along Preston Road and Depot Road, in the Alexandra neighbourhood of Singapore.

History
The campus was a military outpost used by the British Army when Singapore was under British colonial rule, until the withdrawal of British forces in 1971. The school is on the site of the former Alexandra Grammar School which was attended mainly by the children of serving British military personnel serving in Singapore.

ISS formerly had a second campus in Orchard catering to students from Kindergarten to Grade 8, which unified at their campus in Alexandra in 2020.

Academics
ISS is authorised to offer the IB Primary Years Programme, Middle Years Programme, and IB Diploma Programme. 
 
Every year in the Middle School and High school there is an Activity week, and there are smaller scale field trips throughout the school year at all levels.

ISS is an Apple Macintosh platform school with computer labs and a laptop program. The school uses StudyWiz and ManageBac as its e-learning platforms.

In the summer of 2020 the school's IB Diploma top score was 42 and a 96% pass rate, a drop from its usual 100% pass rate, with an average score of 32.4, above the global average but below the Singapore average. The school cited the COVID-19 pandemic for its lower than expected pass rate for that years graduating cohort.

Accreditation
ISS International School believes that accreditation in its many forms allows them to engage in a critical evaluation of their effectiveness as educators as well as develop their curriculum to meet the needs of their students.

ISS is an authorised International Baccalaureate (IB) World School, for students from kindergarten to grade 12, and is Singapore's longest-established IB Continuum school. ISS provides a broad based education through the full IB framework from the IB Primary Years Programme (PYP), to the IB Middle Years Programme (MYP), concluding with the IB Diploma programme (IBDP).

ISS is accredited by the Western Association of Schools and Colleges since February 2005. ISS states that this allows their U.S. styled High School diploma students increased access to American schools and universities. 2011 saw their last full WASC accreditation visit, with an interim visit in 2016. ISS is undergoing another full WASC accreditation visit in 2021. Dr. Margaret Alvarez will join WASC in the summer of 2021 as the new Director of International Accreditation Services, on completion of her current tenure as Head of School of ISS International School, Singapore.

It is a member of the East Asia Regional Council of Overseas Schools since 1996  and a member school of the Council of International Schools (CIS).

ISS is also recognized by the Ministry of Education (Singapore) and is registered with the Committee for Private Education in Singapore. The school received its 4-year EduTrust Certificate, valid from 29 June 2019 to 28 June 2023. EduTrust is a quality certification scheme introduced by the Committee for Private Education as part of the Private Education Act to strengthen the existing registration framework and enforcement provision to regulate the private education sector in Singapore.

References

External links

Western Association of Schools and Colleges
International Baccalaureate Program

International schools in Singapore
International Baccalaureate schools in Singapore
Queenstown, Singapore
Educational institutions established in 1981
1981 establishments in Singapore